opened in Fukui, Fukui Prefecture, Japan, in 1977. The collection, numbering some 2,840 pieces, includes prints by Goya and Picasso and paintings by Iwasa Matabei and artists associated with Okakura Tenshin and the beginnings of the Nihon Bijutsuin.
The museum played and important role for contemporary artist  Ay-O by hosting his first retrospective in 2006.

See also
 Fukui Prefectural Museum of Cultural History
 List of Cultural Properties of Japan - paintings (Fukui)

References

External links
  General Information
  Fukui Fine Arts Museum
  Collection Database

Museums in Fukui Prefecture
Fukui (city)
Art museums and galleries in Japan
Museums established in 1977
1977 establishments in Japan